Clarendon County School District 1 is located in Clarendon County, South Carolina, United States. State legislation has been passed to amalgamate the three school districts in Clarendon County.

See also
 Clarendon County School District 2

References

External links

Education in Clarendon County, South Carolina
School districts in South Carolina